Eilema cuneata is a moth of the  subfamily Arctiinae. It was described by Strand in 1912. It is found in Togo.

References

cuneata
Moths described in 1912
Fauna of Togo
Moths of Africa